The Hall of Kṣitigarbha or Kṣitigarbha Hall is one of the most important annexed halls in Chinese Buddhist temples. It is named after its primary function of enshrining the bodhisattva Kṣitigarbha.

Origin
As his name occurs in Chinese texts such as the Kṣitigarbha Bodhisattva Pūrvapraṇidhāna Sūtra, the Chinese name of Kṣitigarbha is "Dìzàng" (地藏). 

The Daśacakra Kṣitigarbha Sūtra elaborates:

"Kṣitigarbha is patient and immovable like the great earth; his meditation is deep and profound like a secret storehouse."
()

Due to Shakyamuni Buddha's exhortations, Kṣitigarbha has to cultivate all the living creatures in adherence to the Dharma and eliminate all suffering in the period spanning from Shakyamuni's Parinirvana to Maitreya's final birth. Kṣitigarbha has made the vow:

"Until the hells are empty (of suffering beings), I will not become a Buddha."
()
"Once all sentient beings are saved, I will attain Buddhahood."
()
"If I do not descend into hell, who will?" 
()

It is through this gesture of selflessness that he became recognized as "foremost in compassion and vows" and has been worshiped by people since ancient times.

Enshrined image
In Chinese Buddhism, Kṣitigarbha's image is usually in the form of a Buddhist monk; complete with a robe, shaved head or in a vishnu lou cap. He sits in the lotus posture and wields a khakkhara in his left hand, symbolizing the unification of compassion for all living creations whilst holding strictly to the moral precepts. In his right hand is a ruyi, signifying the fulfillment of the wishes of all living creatures. 

Some images depict him standing in a triad that includes a father-son duo: Daoming, a bhikshu who stands to his left, and Mingong, a wealthy elderly man on his right. 

In some larger Buddhist temples, statues of the ten King Yamas flank images of Kṣitigarbha.

References

Further reading

External links

Chinese Buddhist architecture